Maevatanana II is a town and commune in Madagascar. It belongs to the district of Maevatanana, which is a part of Betsiboka Region. The population of the commune was estimated to be approximately 16,000 in 2001 commune census.

Maevatanana II has a riverine harbour. Only primary schooling is available. The majority 80% of the population of the commune are farmers, while an additional 15% receives their livelihood from raising livestock. The most important crops are rice and tobacco, while other important agricultural products are peanuts and cassava.  Additionally fishing employs 5% of the population.

References and notes 

Populated places in Betsiboka